Fernando Gabriel Cáceres (born 7 February 1969) is an Argentine retired professional footballer who played as a central defender.

He played for several clubs in the Primera División and La Liga during his professional career, spending 11 years in the latter competition and appearing in 340 games.

Cáceres represented Argentina at the 1994 World Cup and two Copa América tournaments.

Club career
Born in San Isidro, Buenos Aires, Cáceres began playing professional football at Argentinos Juniors. In 1991 he was transferred to Club Atlético River Plate where he won his first title, the 1991 Apertura.

Cáceres then moved to Spain to play for Real Zaragoza, where he won the Copa del Rey in 1994 and the UEFA Cup Winners' Cup the following year. An undisputed starter from the beginnings, he played 124 official games in three seasons.

Cáceres returned to Argentina for a brief spell at Boca Juniors, before moving back to Spain in late 1996 and sign for Valencia CF, where he stayed until the end of the 1997–98 campaign. He joined RC Celta de Vigo aged almost 29, helping to the Galicians' La Liga and European consolidation. In six seasons with the club he played 218 matches in all competitions, scoring five goals most notably contributing 33 appearances in 2002–03 as his team qualified for the UEFA Champions League for the first time ever.

In January 2005, after a four-month spell with Córdoba CF in the Segunda División, Cáceres returned to his country once again after signing with Club Atlético Independiente, joining a select group of players who played for River Plate, Boca Juniors and Independiente. In 2006 he rejoined Argentinos Juniors, the club where he began his career 20 years earlier, seeing out his career at 38.

International career
Cáceres won the South American Under-17 Football Championship in 1985. At full international level, he earned 24 caps for the Argentina national team, and was also part of the squad that won the 1993 Copa América and the one that took part in the 1994 FIFA World Cup.

Personal life
On 1 November 2009, Cáceres was shot in the head in an attempted robbery while driving his car in a Buenos Aires suburb. He was kept in a drug induced coma for eight weeks.

Cáceres got out of the coma on 29 December, moving to a hospital in Ciudadela, where he began to slowly recover.

Honours
River Plate
Argentine Primera División: Apertura 1991

Zaragoza
Copa del Rey: 1993–94
UEFA Cup Winners' Cup: 1994–95

Celta
UEFA Intertoto Cup: 2000

Argentina
Copa América: 1993

References

External links

1969 births
Living people
People from San Isidro, Buenos Aires
Argentine sportspeople of Spanish descent
Sportspeople from Buenos Aires Province
Argentine footballers
Association football defenders
Argentine Primera División players
Argentinos Juniors footballers
Club Atlético River Plate footballers
Boca Juniors footballers
Club Atlético Independiente footballers
La Liga players
Segunda División players
Real Zaragoza players
Valencia CF players
RC Celta de Vigo players
Córdoba CF players
Argentina youth international footballers
Argentina international footballers
1994 FIFA World Cup players
1993 Copa América players
1995 Copa América players
Copa América-winning players
Argentine expatriate footballers
Expatriate footballers in Spain
Argentine expatriate sportspeople in Spain
Shooting survivors